was a town located in Aira District, Kagoshima Prefecture, Japan.

As of 2003, the town had an estimated population of 7,311 and the density of 89.94 persons per km². The total area was 81.29 km².

On March 23, 2010, Kamō, along with the towns of Aira (former) and Kajiki (all from Aira District), was merged to create the city of Aira. Aira District will be left with one municipality.

Kamō is home to the oldest Camphor laurel tree (Cinnamomum camphora) in Japan. The tree is approximately 1500 years old, and stretches 34m across, and 30m high. It was heavily damaged in typhoons in 1997 and 2004. A large hollow, with a diameter of 4.5m, exists inside the tree. This hollow was a favorite resting place for homeless men in Kagoshima until a locked door was installed in April 2000.

The tree, fondly referred to as Ōkusu (大楠, great camphor) by locals, is located on the grounds of Hachiman Jinja, a shinto shrine.

Every November an autumn festival called Donto Matsuri takes place on the grounds of Hachiman Jinja.

References

External links
Aira City official website 

Dissolved municipalities of Kagoshima Prefecture